Etna is an unincorporated community in Garfield County, Oklahoma, United States. Etna is east-southeast of Enid, off U.S. 412 and south on County 950.  It lies at an elevation of 1184 feet (361 m).

References

Unincorporated communities in Garfield County, Oklahoma
Unincorporated communities in Oklahoma